Bernard "Benny" Rothman (1 June 1911 – 23 January 2002) was a British political activist, most famous for his leading role in the Mass trespass of Kinder Scout in 1932.

Born in Cheetham Hill, Manchester, into a Jewish family from Romania, Rothman's poor family circumstances dictated that he start work at the earliest opportunity rather than take full advantage of a scholarship that he had won.

Working as an errand boy in the motor trade, he studied geography and economics in his spare time while his Aunt Ettie introduced him to The Ragged Trousered Philanthropists and the works of Upton Sinclair.

Increasingly committed to the causes of socialism and communism, Rothman lost his job after getting into some trouble with the law while selling copies of the Daily Worker. During a period of unemployment, with the help of a bicycle salvaged from spare parts, he discovered the nearby wilderness regions of the Peak District and North Wales. The combination of his political activism and interest in the outdoors led to his participation in the mass trespass of 1932, an enterprise that resulted in a spell in prison and further employment difficulties.

In 1934, Rothman went to work at Avro in Newton Heath and instantly became an officer of the Amalgamated Engineering Union (AEU). At Avro, he met and married fellow communist Lily Crabtree but his political views became increasingly visible to his employer and he was dismissed. Rothman was active in working with Jewish groups in Manchester to oppose the campaigns of Oswald Mosley's British Union of Fascists. In 1936, he started work at Metropolitan-Vickers at Trafford Park and was again soon an AEU official.

Until his death from a stroke, he was active in a wide range of political and conservation movement campaigns and organisations.

Professor Harry Rothman is his son.

Bibliography
Rothman, B. (1982) 1932 Kinder Trespass: Personal View of the Kinder Scout Mass Trespass

External links 
 Benny Rothman Dies, telegraph.co.uk
 Biography at the Working Class Movement Library
 Details of Benny Rothman archives at WCML

1911 births
2002 deaths
20th-century British people
British activists
British trade unionists
Metropolitan-Vickers people
British Jews
English people of Romanian-Jewish descent
People from Cheetham Hill
Communist Party of Great Britain members